Aphrodita is a genus of marine polychaete worms found in the Mediterranean sea and the eastern and western Atlantic Ocean.

Several members of this genus are known as "sea mice".

Etymology

The name of the genus is taken from Aphrodite, the Ancient Greek goddess of love, said to be because of a supposed resemblance to human female genitalia. The English name may derive from the  resemblance to a bedraggled house mouse when washed up on shore.

Description
The body of the sea mouse is covered in a dense mat of parapodia and setae (hairlike structures). The sea mouse has two pairs of feeler-like appendages close to the mouth and does not have eyes. Locomotion is carried out by several small, bristly, paddle-like appendages. They are hermaphroditic which means that they have functional reproductive organs of both sexes. The eggs of one individual are fertilised by the sperm of another.

Structural coloration

The spines, or setae on the scaled back of the sea mouse are a unique feature. Normally, these have a deep red sheen, warning off predators, but when the light shines on them perpendicularly, they flush green and blue, a "remarkable example of photonic engineering by a living organism". This structural coloration is a defense mechanism, giving a warning signal to potential predators. The effect is produced by many hexagonal cylinders within the spines, which "perform much more efficiently than man-made optical fibres".

Feeding

Aphrodita are typically scavengers. However, Aphrodita aculeata is an active predator, feeding primarily on small crabs, hermit crabs and other polychaete worms such as Pectinaria.

Species
Species recognized by the World Register of Marine Species:

Aphrodita abyssalis Kirkegaard, 1996
Aphrodita aculeata Linnaeus, 1758
Aphrodita acuminata Ehlers, 1887
Aphrodita alta Kinberg, 1856
Aphrodita annulata Pennant, 1777
Aphrodita aphroditoides (McIntosh, 1885)
Aphrodita armifera Moore, 1910
Aphrodita audouini Castelnau, 1842<'small>
Aphrodita australis Baird, 1865
Aphrodita bamarookis Hutchings & McRae, 1993
Aphrodita bisetosa Rozbaczylo & Canahuire, 2000
Aphrodita brevitentaculata Essenberg, 1917
Aphrodita californica Essenberg, 1917
Aphrodita clavigera Freminville, 1812
Aphrodita daiyumaruae Imajima, 2005
Aphrodita decipiens (Horst, 1916)
Aphrodita defendens Chamberlin, 1919
Aphrodita diplops Fauchald, 1977
Aphrodita echidna Quatrefages, 1866
Aphrodita elliptica
Aphrodita falcifera Hartman, 1939
Aphrodita goolmarris Hutchings & McRae, 1993
Aphrodita hoptakero Otto in Audouin & Milne Edwards, 1832
Aphrodita japonica Marenzeller, 1879
Aphrodita kulmaris Hutchings & McRae, 1993
Aphrodita limosa (Horst, 1916)
Aphrodita longicornis Kinberg, 1855
Aphrodita longipalpa Essenberg, 1917
Aphrodita macroculata Imajima, 2001
Aphrodita magellanica Malard, 1891
Aphrodita malayana (Horst, 1916)
Aphrodita malkaris Hutchings & McRae, 1993
Aphrodita maorica Benham, 1900
Aphrodita marombis Hutchings & McRae, 1993
Aphrodita mexicana Kudenov, 1975
Aphrodita modesta Quatrefages, 1866
Aphrodita negligens Moore, 1905
Aphrodita nipponensis Imajima, 2003
Aphrodita obtecta Ehlers, 1887
Aphrodita parva Moore, 1905
Aphrodita perarmata Roule, 1898
Aphrodita refulgida Moore, 1910
Aphrodita rossi Knox & Cameron, 1998
Aphrodita roulei Horst, 1917
Aphrodita scolopendra Bruguière, 1789
Aphrodita sericea Castelnau, 1842
Aphrodita sibogae (Horst, 1916)
Aphrodita sondaica Grube, 1875
Aphrodita sonorae Kudenov, 1975
Aphrodita talpa Quatrefages, 1866
Aphrodita terraereginae Haswell, 1883
Aphrodita tosaensis Imajima, 2001
Aphrodita watasei Izuka, 1912

References

External links

 Sea Mouse images
 A Natural Photonic Crystal

Phyllodocida